Outlying Islands Ferry Pier means the ferry piers which provide ferry service outside Victoria Harbour in Central, Hong Kong. It now refers to Central Piers No.2 to No.6, near International Finance Centre. The ferry routes travel between Central and Ma Wan (Park Island), Lantau Island (Discovery Bay and Mui Wo), Lamma Island (Sok Kwu Wan and Yung Shue Wan), Cheung Chau and Peng Chau.

References

External links
 

Central, Hong Kong
Piers in Hong Kong
Victoria Harbour